Creatonotos perineti is a moth of the  family Erebidae. It was described by Rothschild in 1933. It is found in Madagascar.

References

Spilosomina
Moths described in 1933
Moths of Madagascar
Moths of Africa